The 1960–61 Serie A season was won by Juventus.

Teams
Torino, Lecco and Catania had been promoted from Serie B.

Final classification

Results

Relegation tie-breaker

Bari relegated to Serie B.

Top goalscorers

References and sources
Almanacco Illustrato del Calcio - La Storia 1898-2004, Panini Edizioni, Modena, September 2005

External links
  - All results on RSSSF Website.

Serie A seasons
Italy
1960–61 in Italian football leagues